"Honkytonk U" is a song written and recorded by American country music artist Toby Keith. It was released on February 8, 2005 as the lead-off single and title track from his 2005 album Honkytonk University. The song peaked at number 8 in the United States, and it reached number 6 in Canada.

Content
The song describe's Toby Keith's past and early career stages, and when he used to go to his grandmother's nightclub every summer and work until late at night when he got to sit with the band.

Critical reception
Kevin John Coyne, reviewing the song for Country Universe, gave it a negative rating. He summed up his review by stating that this song is an example of why Keith doesn't win Grammy Awards.

Music video
The music video was directed by Michael Salomon, and premiered on CMT on February 12, 2005. The video begins in 1972, where Keith works at his grandmother's nightclub in Fort Smith, Arkansas when he was a child, and the nightclub was called Billie's. Then, it cuts to Keith performing in the present day (2005), showing photographs of Keith in his younger days, and showing footage of Keith in Baghdad. This video is dedicated to Keith's grandmother, who died in 2005.

Chart positions
"Honkytonk U" debuted at number 30 on the U.S. Billboard Hot Country Singles & Tracks for the week of February 12, 2005.

Year-end charts

References

2005 songs
Toby Keith songs
2005 singles
Songs written by Toby Keith
Song recordings produced by James Stroud
DreamWorks Records singles
Music videos directed by Michael Salomon